BBC v HarperCollins (2010) EWHC 2424 was a 2010 case in English law, in which the BBC applied for an injunction to prevent HarperCollins publishing a book by Ben Collins, which was to reveal his identity as the racing driver known as 'The Stig' on the BBC's Top Gear programme.

Judgement
The BBC was not granted the injunction. HarperCollins thus released the book in September 2010.

See also 
 BBC v Johns
 R (ProLife Alliance) v. BBC

References

External links
Bailii

High Court of Justice cases
Harper Collins
.•
Top Gear
2010 in case law
2010 in British television
2010 in British law
English privacy case law